David Z. Horvath (May 28, 1971) is an American illustrator, comics artist, toy designer and author best known for creating the popular Uglydoll characters as well as the world they inhabit, The Uglyverse, with his wife, Sun-Min Kim. The toy line began in 2001 with a single plush toy called Wage, hand sewn by his sweetheart and creative partner, Sun-Min Kim for David as a gift, and grew into the brand.

Kim and Horvath were later married. Today they live in Los Angeles and have two kids: a daughter and a son.

Along with a plush Uglydoll line, he is also the author and illustrator of 12 Uglydoll books, including the four "Ugly Guides" and a series of comic books, and the Bossy Bear series of children’s books. His books have been reprinted in Korean, Japanese, and Spanish.

Education

Horvath attended Parsons: The New School For Design.

Characters 

 
David Horvath and Sun-Min Kim are the creators of multiple characters and toy lines including:
 Uglydolls
 Bossy Bear, Bissy Bear, and Turtle
 Crocadoca
 Noupa
 Littlebony
 Choco and Minty
 Roller the Reindeer
 Dunnys with Kidrobot
 Kaiju including:
Mothman
Flatwoods
Chupacabra
Uma
Wage
Ice-Bat
 Super Puncher
 Power Mister
 Pounda and Chu Chu
 My Friend Dave

Noupa is a heroic garbage man who organizes a small underground movement against the evils of Super 7.5 robots in a struggle of nature VS commerce.  The Noupa world includes 21 characters. In the early 2000s, Flying Cat produced these 21 characters as vinyl figures which were distributed by Critterbox. Five of the figures were limited releases exclusive to  toy shows.  Collectors refer to the entire series of characters as "Noupa."

Adaptations 

An UglyDolls animated film was released by STX Entertainment on May 3, 2019 to mixed reviews.

A TV series based on the property is in the works for Hulu, as announced the same year.

A Bossy Bear animated series was announced in March 2022 for Nickelodeon. Preschool-aimed, it is set to premiere in 2023 with an initial 30 episode order.

Awards

 Toy Of The Year Award by Toy Industry Association
 Oppenheim Best Toy Award
 Parent's Choice Approved Award

Publications
 How to Draw Ugly (2006) 
 Bossy Bear (2007) 
 The UglyDoll Ugly Guide #1: To the Uglyverse (2008) 
 The UglyDoll Ugly Guide #2: To Things That Go and Things That Should Go But Don't (2008) 
 The UglyDoll Ugly Guide #3: To Being Alive and Staying That Way (2009) 
 Just Like Bossy Bear (2009) 
 Chilly Chilly Ice-Bat (2009) 
 1 2 3 4 U (2009) 
 ABC U Later (2009) 
 The UglyDoll Ugly Guide #4: To Eating Out and Keeping It Down (2010) 
 Ugly Colors (2010) 
 Babo's Cookie Problem (2011) 
 What Dat? (2011) 
 Uglydoll: SHHHHHHH (2013) Comic Book 
 Uglydoll: Eat Dat! (2013) Comic Book
Uglydoll: Goin' Places (2013) Comic Book

References

Sources
Wall Street Journal Interview
Vinyl Creep
Los Angeles Times Article

External links
Official Uglydoll Website

American comics artists
American toy industry businesspeople
1971 births
American illustrators
American children's writers
Living people